Following is an incomplete list of past and present Members of Parliament (MPs) of the United Kingdom whose surnames begin with t.  The dates in parentheses are the periods for which they were MPs. 

Thomas Noon Talfourd (1835–1841), (1847–1849)
Mark Tami (2001–present)
Peter Tapsell (1959–1964), (1966–2018)
Dick Taverne (1962–1974)
Ann Taylor (1974–1983), (1987–2005)
Dari Taylor (1997–2010)
David Taylor (1997–2009)
Herbert Taylor (1820–1823)
Ian Taylor (1987–2010)
John Taylor, Baron Kilclooney (1983–2001)
John Mark Taylor (1983–2005)
Matthew Taylor, Baron Taylor of Goss Moor (1987–2010)
Richard Taylor (2001–2010)
Robert Taylor (1970–1981)
Teddy Taylor (1964–2005)
Sarah Teather
Norman Tebbit
Peter Temple-Morris, Baron Temple-Morris
James Emerson Tennent
Margaret Thatcher (1959–1992)
Gareth Thomas
George Thomas, 1st Viscount Tonypandy  (1945–1983)
James Henry Thomas (1910–1936)
Peter Thomas
Simon Thomas
Donald Thompson
Charles Poulett Thomson, 1st Baron Sydenham
George Thomson, Baron Thomson of Monifieth
Emily Thornberry
Will Thorne
Peter Thorneycroft
Jeremy Thorpe
Henry Thrale
Ernest Thurtle
Stephen Timms
Edward Timpson
Paddy Tipping
William Tite
Mark Todd
Jenny Tonge
Graham Tope
Don Touhig
John Townend
Cyril Townsend
David Tredinnick
Michael Trend
Jon Trickett
Neville Trotter
Paul Truswell
George Clement Tryon, 1st Baron Tryon
Andrew Turner
Dennis Turner
Des Turner
George Turner
Neil Turner
Edward Turnour, 6th Earl Winterton
Derek Twigg
Stephen Twigg
Paul Tyler
Bill Tynan
Andrew Tyrie

 T